Stachys ajugoides is a species of flowering plant in the mint family known by the common name bugle hedgenettle. It is native to western North America, where it can be found in many types of habitat in Oregon, California, and Baja California, especially moist areas. It is an aromatic herb with serrate leaves. The inflorescence is a spike of interrupted clusters of flowers, often in shades of pink.

References

External links

Jepson Manual Treatment
Photo gallery

ajugoides
Flora of California
Flora of Oregon
Flora of Baja California
Garden plants
Flora without expected TNC conservation status